Lukáš Marek (born 30 January 1981) is a retired Czech football player who played in the Czech First League for Bohemians 1905.

References

External links
 
 

1981 births
Living people
Czech footballers
Czech Republic youth international footballers
Czech Republic under-21 international footballers
Association football defenders
Czech First League players
Bohemians 1905 players